Dysnectes brevis is a member of Fornicata.

References

Metamonads